Liu Hong (born 12 May 1987) is a Chinese female race walker. She is the world record holder over the Olympic 20 km distance with a time of 1:24:38 hours, set in 2015.

Liu has won multiple medals in the World Championships in Athletics, including four gold medals in 2011, 2013, 2015, and 2019 and a silver medal in 2009. She placed fourth at the Summer Olympics in 2008 and was retrospectively upgraded to silver in 2012 Olympic 20 km racewalking. Liu is the 2016 Olympic 20 km racewalking gold medalist. Liu is a two-time gold medalist at the Asian Games, winning in 2006 and 2010. She was the runner-up at the IAAF World Race Walking Cup in 2014. In her early career, she was the World Junior Champion in 2006.

Career
She first came to prominence by winning the World Junior and Asian Games titles in 2006. After a poor global debut at the 2007 World Championships in Athletics (19th), she rebounded with a fourth-place finish at the 2008 Beijing Olympics. However, since Russia's Olga Kaniskina was disqualified in March 2016 for doping, Liu is expected to be awarded the bronze medal. She secured her first major medal at the 2009 World Championships in Athletics, taking the bronze medal. Later that year she took the national title at the 11th Chinese National Games.

Liu retained her title at the 2010 Asian Games and broke the Games record with a time of 1:30:06 hours. She opened her 2011 season with a win on the 2011 racewalking circuit at the Memorial Mario Albisetti. She followed this with a win in Taicang, equalling her personal best in the process. A third circuit win came in Dublin that year. She won the gold medal at the 2011 World Championships in Athletics. Liu broke the Asian record for the 20 km walk in Taicang in 2012, defeating Wang Yan's decade-old record with a time of 1:25:46 hours.

She placing third behind Qieyang Shenjie who also broke her Asian record, at the 2012 London Olympics. Liu won at the 2012 IAAF World Race Walking Challenge Final, however, and defeated Qieyang en route to breaking Jin Bingjie's 22-year-old Asian record for the 5000 m walk at the Chinese University Games. She set an event record in her first race of 2013, winning the Memorial Albisetti in a time of 1:27:06 hours.

She broke the world record for the 20 km walk at the Gran Premio Cantones de La Coruña. Taking advantage of warm conditions, she completed the distance in 1:24:38 hours, walking the second 10 km faster than the first, to improve the world record by 24 seconds. This was the fastest time ever, also beating Olimpiada Ivanova and Olga Kaniskina's times that were not ratified as records due to a lack of international judges.

After testing positive for higenamine in May 2016, she was banned from 13 June to 13 July 2016.

She won the gold medal with 1:28:35 in women's 20 km walk at Rio Olympic Games on 19 August 2016.

After a year off competition to have a baby, in 2019 she became the first woman ever to finish the 50 kilometer walk in less than four hours, finishing in 3 hours, 59 minutes and 15 seconds at the Chinese Race Walk Grand Prix. 

Later that year, she won her third gold medal in the 20 km walk at the 2019 World Championships in Athletics in Doha, Qatar.

International competitions

References

External links

1987 births
Living people
People from Ji'an
Athletes from Jiangxi
Chinese female racewalkers
Olympic athletes of China
Athletes (track and field) at the 2008 Summer Olympics
Athletes (track and field) at the 2012 Summer Olympics
Athletes (track and field) at the 2016 Summer Olympics
Athletes (track and field) at the 2020 Summer Olympics
Asian Games gold medalists for China
Asian Games medalists in athletics (track and field)
Athletes (track and field) at the 2006 Asian Games
Athletes (track and field) at the 2010 Asian Games
Doping cases in athletics
World Athletics Championships athletes for China
World Athletics Championships medalists
World Athletics record holders
Olympic gold medalists for China
Olympic bronze medalists for China
Olympic gold medalists in athletics (track and field)
Olympic bronze medalists in athletics (track and field)
Medalists at the 2016 Summer Olympics
Medalists at the 2020 Summer Olympics
Medalists at the 2006 Asian Games
Medalists at the 2010 Asian Games
Olympic female racewalkers
World record holders in athletics (track and field)
World Athletics Championships winners